Sans Souci is an unincorporated community in Mississippi County, Arkansas, United States.

References

Unincorporated communities in Mississippi County, Arkansas
Unincorporated communities in Arkansas